Donald Nunatak is a nunatak  north of Gray Nunatak in the Seal Nunataks group, off the east coast of the Antarctic Peninsula. It was charted in 1902 by the Swedish Antarctic Expedition under Otto Nordenskiöld, and named by him for Dr. C.W. Donald, ship's doctor and naturalist on the Active, one of the vessels of the Dundee Whaling Expedition, 1892–93.

References 

Nunataks of Graham Land
Oscar II Coast